Ștefan Octavian Iosif (11 October 1875 – 22 June 1913) was an Austro-Hungarian-born Romanian poet and translator.

Life
Born in Brașov, Transylvania (part of Austria-Hungary at the time), he studied in his native town and in Sibiu before completing his education in Paris. While in France, he met Dimitrie Anghel, who would become a long-time friend. In Bucharest, Iosif, Anghel and Emil Gârleanu created a literary society (1909), the Romanian Writers' Society; Iosif later became associated with Sămănătorul.

His friendship with Anghel came to an abrupt end after the two writers fell in love with the same woman, Natalia Negru. She was first married to Iosif, but divorced him in order to remarry Anghel. The latter was drawn to despair by her infidelities, and committed suicide in 1914. Iosif had died the year before, at a hospital in Bucharest, after having suffered a stroke. He was buried at Bellu cemetery.

Works
Patriarhale (1901)
Romanțe din Heine (1901)
Poezii (1902)
Din zile mari (1905)
Credințe (1905)

External links

 

1875 births
1913 deaths
Romanian people of Aromanian descent
Austro-Hungarian emigrants to Romania
Burials at Bellu Cemetery
People from Brașov
Romanian Austro-Hungarians
20th-century Romanian poets
Romanian male poets
Romanian translators
Austro-Hungarian writers
20th-century translators
20th-century Romanian male writers
19th-century translators